The Johnston ministry was the combined Cabinet (formally the Executive Council of British Columbia) that governed British Columbia from April 2, 1991, to November 5, 1991. It was led by Rita Johnston, the 29th premier of British Columbia, and consisted of members of the Social Credit Party.

The Johnston ministry was in office for the last seven months of the 34th Parliament of British Columbia. Johnston was Deputy Premier of British Columbia in the preceding Vander Zalm ministry; following Bill Vander Zalm's resignation, caucus selected her to be the interim leader (and thus premier) while the party could organize a leadership convention. Johnston successfully stood for the permanent leadership. She was the first female first minister in Canada.

Following the 1991 election, which the Social Credit Party lost, the ministry was replaced by the Harcourt ministry.

List of ministers

Cabinet shuffles

On April 8, Johnston reappointed Mel Couvelier as finance minister. Couvelier had previously been finance minister under Vander Zalm, but had resigned on March 6 as a protest against Vander Zalm's conflict-of-interest investigation. Elwood Veitch, who had taken over the finance ministry after Couvelier's resignation, remained in cabinet as minister of international business and immigration.

Johnston shuffled her cabinet on April 15. Three new members joined: Graham Bruce, Larry Chalmers and David Mercier. Notably, Bruce and Mercier were two of the four MLAs who had quit the party caucus in 1989 in protest of Vander Zalm's leadership. Meanwhile, four ministers left cabinet: Harry de Jong, Cliff Michael, Cliff Serwa and Bud Smith. Several portfolios were reconfigured or merged to accommodate the slightly-smaller cabinet. The new Ministry of Lands and Parks was created by joining the Ministry of Parks and Ministry of Crown Lands; the tourism and international business portfolios were combined as the new Ministry of Development, Trade and Tourism; and the remaining immigration portfolio was expanded to include multiculturalism.

On May 7, Johnston fired Couvelier from cabinet for allegedly breaching the confidentiality provisions of the Financial Institutions Act. Couvelier's departure caused a mini-shuffle: John Jansen was named the new finance minister, Bruce Strachan moved into Jansen's old role as health minister, and Stan Hagen took over Strachan's old portfolio of advanced education (while still remaining education minister).

On May 29, Peter Albert Dueck was appointed Minister of Advanced Education. Dueck had previously been in Vander Zalm's cabinet until being forced to resign in May 1990 over an expenses scandal; after an RCMP investigation cleared him of any wrongdoing, Johnston invited him back to cabinet.

Notes

References

Citations

Sources

Politics of British Columbia
Executive Council of British Columbia
1991 establishments in British Columbia
Cabinets established in 1991
1991 disestablishments in British Columbia
Cabinets disestablished in 1991